Stanley Morgan Jr. (born September 7, 1996) is an American football wide receiver for the Cincinnati Bengals of the National Football League (NFL). He played college football at Nebraska and signed with the Bengals as an undrafted free agent in 2019.

Professional career

Morgan signed with the Cincinnati Bengals as an undrafted free agent following the 2019 NFL Draft. He was waived during final roster cuts on August 31, 2019 and signed to the practice squad the next day. He was promoted to the active roster on October 2, 2019.

On September 5, 2020, Morgan was waived by the Bengals and signed to the practice squad the next day. He was elevated to the active roster on November 14 for the team's week 10 game against the Pittsburgh Steelers, and reverted to the practice squad after the game. He was placed on the practice squad/COVID-19 list by the team on November 20, 2020, and restored to the practice squad on December 2. He was elevated again on December 5 for the week 13 game against the Miami Dolphins, and reverted to the practice squad again following the game. He was promoted to the active roster on December 12, 2020.

On March 28, 2022, the Bengals re-signed Morgan to a two-year contract that runs through the 2023 season.

References

External links
Nebraska Cornhuskers football bio

1996 births
Living people
American football wide receivers
Cincinnati Bengals players
Nebraska Cornhuskers football players
Players of American football from New Orleans